The 1998–99 Bob Lord Challenge Trophy, known as the Endsleigh Brokers Challenge Trophy for sponsorship reasons, was a football tournament for clubs competing in that season's Football Conference. Doncaster Rovers beat Farnborough Town 4-0 in the final, played over two legs.

Results

First round

Second round

Quarter-finals

Semi-finals
Played over two legs although only one leg of the Farnborough v Cheltenham tie was played.

Final
Played over two legs

References

The Official Football Association Non League Club Directory 2000  

1998–99 in English football
Conference League Cup